Jimmy Gerardo Medranda Obando (born February 7, 1994) is a Colombian professional footballer who currently plays as a defender or midfielder for the Columbus Crew in Major League Soccer.

Career

Deportivo Pereira
Medranda joined the youth program of Colombian club Deportivo Pereira at the age of 12 before eventually earning promotion to the first team at the age of 18. He made two league appearances in Categoría Primera B during the 2012 season in addition to a Copa Colombia appearance.

In 2013, he made seven league appearances, including four starts, and scored one goal in addition to six Copa Colombia appearances.

Sporting Kansas City
In August 2013, Medranda was loaned to Sporting Kansas City in Major League Soccer. He made his debut with Sporting in a September 3–0 victory over the Columbus Crew.

Sporting made the transfer permanent ahead of the 2014 season.

On November 19, 2019, Medranda was selected by Nashville SC in the 2019 MLS Expansion Draft.

Nashville SC
Medranda made one appearance with Nashville SC.

Seattle Sounders FC
On 21 October 2020, Medranda was traded to Seattle Sounders FC, along with $225,000 in General Allocation Money, for Handwalla Bwana.

Columbus Crew 
On 23 December 2022, the Columbus Crew announced they had signed Medranda as a free agent.

Career statistics

Club

Honours 
Sporting Kansas City
MLS Cup: 2013
U.S. Open Cup: 2015, 2017

Seattle Sounders FC
CONCACAF Champions League: 2022

References

External links

1994 births
Living people
Sportspeople from Nariño Department
Colombian footballers
Association football midfielders
Association football defenders
Categoría Primera B players
Deportivo Pereira footballers
Major League Soccer players
USL Championship players
Sporting Kansas City players
OKC Energy FC players
Sporting Kansas City II players
Nashville SC players
Seattle Sounders FC players
Tacoma Defiance players
Columbus Crew players
Colombian expatriate footballers
Colombian expatriate sportspeople in the United States
Expatriate soccer players in the United States
MLS Next Pro players